Neil Geoffrey Pointon (born 28 November 1964) is an English former professional footballer. Pointon was a left-back who is perhaps best remembered for playing for Everton, Manchester City and Oldham Athletic.

Career
Pointon began his career at lower-league Scunthorpe United and quickly established himself as a regular first-teamer and a consistent and reliable performer in defence. In the autumn of 1985, after four years at Scunthorpe, Pointon was bought by the reigning English league champions Everton for £75,000, manager Howard Kendall hoping Pointon could provide squad cover for regular left-back Pat Van Den Hauwe. Ultimately Pointon ended up featuring in the majority of Everton's games during the remainder of the 1985/86 season as a result of Van den Hauwe moving to central defence to cover for the injured centre-back Derek Mountfield. Everton finished that season as runners-up to local rivals Liverpool in both the league championship and the FA Cup, though Pointon played no part in the FA Cup final due to Mountfield's return to fitness.

In the following season, Pointon struggled with injury and had to compete with not only Van den Hauwe but also veteran defender Paul Power, signed from Manchester City, for the left-back spot at Goodison. Pointon did however play enough games that year to qualify for a Championship winners medal as Everton won their second title in three years.

Over the next couple of years Pointon was a consistent performer in the Everton defence when called up to the first team, although Kendall's departure to Athletic Bilbao and the break-up of the Championship winning side saw a decline in the club's fortunes. During 1989/90, Pointon became Everton's first choice left-back following the sale of Van den Hauwe to Tottenham Hotspur.

In the summer of 1990, Pointon left Everton to rejoin Howard Kendall at his new club Manchester City, with Kendall receiving Pointon and £300,000 in exchange for Andy Hinchcliffe. Pointon spent two years at City as a first-team regular before moving on to Joe Royle's Oldham Athletic, then a top-flight club. Pointon spent three years at Boundary Park, during which time the club were relegated from the Premiership.

On 10 April 1994, Pointon put the Latics ahead in the 106th minute (extra time) of the FA Cup semi final at Wembley Stadium against Manchester United, only for Mark Hughes to equalise one minute before the final whistle and force a replay. The replay at Maine Road saw the Latics lose 4–1, with Pointon scoring Oldham's consolation goal. 
United went on to win both the Premier League title and FA Cup, while Pointon and his colleagues had the double misery of an FA Cup exit and Premier League relegation in less than a month. During this period Neil made the tabloid papers following a brief liaison with television personality Dani Behr.

Pointon joined Scottish Premier Division outfit Heart of Midlothian in 1995, enjoying a number of seasons up in Scotland before later playing for Walsall, Chesterfield and Hednesford Town. He scored for Hednesford against former club Oldham Athletic in an FA Cup tie at Keys Park, soon before being handed the reins as Manager at Hednesford. He lasted as little as 9 games in his first Managerial post before being sacked after not winning a single game. The club were later relegated.

After a spell as player-manager of Retford United he joined Mossley as a player and helped Mossley to win the Worthington Challenge Trophy at Gigg Lane, Bury with a 2–1 win over Clitheroe in his last ever professional game.

He currently works for Higher Lane Primary School as a sports coach.

References

External links

1964 births
Chesterfield F.C. players
English footballers
Everton F.C. players
Heart of Midlothian F.C. players
Living people
Manchester City F.C. players
Oldham Athletic A.F.C. players
Premier League players
Scunthorpe United F.C. players
Walsall F.C. players
Bolton Wanderers F.C. non-playing staff
Footballers from Mansfield
Scottish Football League players
English Football League players
Association football fullbacks
Mossley A.F.C. players
Retford United F.C. managers
Retford United F.C. players
Hednesford Town F.C. players
Hednesford Town F.C. managers
English football managers